Caspar Zafer (born 26 October 1974)  is an English actor.

Career 

Zafer was born October 26, 1974 and spent much of his childhood and early life in the Middle East. He trained in theatre at The Oxford School of Drama.  From 2001 to 2002 he performed in the television series Dream Team. Following this  the movie La Femme Musketeer he held the role of Gaston Athos. Following years he had engagements in different television- and movie productions including Too Much Romance... It's Time for Stuffed Peppers  starring alongside Sophia Loren and F. Murray Abraham in 2004, True True Lie and Tirant lo Blanc in 2006 where he played the lead.  Following this he starred in numerous films until moving to U.S TV In 2012 where he had the role from the original vampire Finn Mikaelson in the television series The Vampire Diaries. He starred in The Originals on the CW, reprising his role as Finn Mikaelson in his original body.

Rowing 

Zafer is also a world record holder in Ocean rowing. In August 2014 he won the Great Pacific Race along with three others in their boat Uniting Nations. They became the first four-man crew to row 2400 miles from Mainland United States (Monterey) to Wakiki Hawaii. They are also the fastest crossing the Pacific in 43 days.

Filmography

Television

References

External links 
 

1974 births
21st-century English male actors
English male film actors
English male television actors
Living people
Place of birth missing (living people)